Mezhyhirya is a toponym of Ukrainian origin which means land between mounts or land between hills.

It can refer to:

 Mezhyhirya Monastery, a destroyed monastery in Kyiv Oblast
 Mezhyhirya ravine, located in Kyiv Oblast
 Mezhyhirya (residence), a former private residence of former Ukrainian President Viktor Yanukovych in Novi Petrivtsi, Vyshhorod Raion
 Mezhyhirya, a village in Rykiv community, Sambir Raion, Lviv Oblast
 Mezhyhirya, a village in Ustya-Zelene community, Chortkiv Raion, Ternopil Oblast

See also
 Mizhhiria, a similar toponym
 Mizhhiria, an urban-type settlement in Zakarpattia Oblast of western Ukraine
 Mizhhiria (formerly Baqsan), a village in Zelenohirske community, Bilohirsk Raion
 Mizhhiria, a village in Markovychi community, Lokachi Raion
 Mizhhiria, a village of Ivano-Frankivsk Oblast
 Mizhhiria, a small village of seven people in Chapayevka community, Dykanka Raion
 Mizhhiria, a village in Syvky community, Shepetivka Raion, Khmelnytskyi Oblast
 Univ (until 2003 Mizhhiria), a village in Korosne community, Lviv Raion, Lviv Oblast
 Monastyrok (until 1992 Mizhhiria), a village in Bilche-Zolote community, Chortkiv Raion, Ternopil Oblast
 Međugorje, Bosnia and Herzegovina (name derived from the same Slavic roots)